Buona Vista is a housing estate located in the subzones of one-north and Holland Drive in the residential township of Queenstown in Singapore. The housing estate is served by the Buona Vista MRT station which links it up with the MRT system. It also has a bus terminal.

History
The Buona Vista estate was developed by the Housing and Development Board in the early 1970s as the neighbourhood 6 of Queenstown. The first flats (at Holland Close and Holland Avenue) were balloted on 10 July 1973 under the Home Ownership for the People Scheme.

Geography
The Buona Vista estate is centred around Holland Close, Holland Avenue and Holland Drive. It is close to the Dover and Ghim Moh estates, and Holland Village. It shares its name with North Buona Vista Road and South Buona Vista Road, which together is a hilly winding road that navigates through Kent Ridge.

Political history
Buona Vista is divided between the Tanjong Pagar Group Representation Constituency (GRC) and the West Coast GRC. The Member of Parliament for the portion belonging to Tanjong Pagar GRC, which formerly belonged to Holland-Bukit Timah GRC, which includes Holland Drive and Holland Village is Chan Chun Sing, the Minister of Trade & Industry.

References

Sources
Victor R Savage, Brenda S A Yeoh (2003), Toponymics - A Study of Singapore Street Names, Eastern Universities Press, 

Places in Singapore
Housing estates in Singapore
Queenstown, Singapore